The Wyoming Governor's Mansion is the official residence of the governor of Wyoming.  The current mansion was built during 1976 in Cheyenne.

The public can tour the residence Monday through Saturday from 9:00am to 5:00pm and Sunday 1pm to 5pm. There is no admission fee.

Historic Governor's Mansion

The previous residence, now known as the Historic Governor's Mansion, served from 1905 to 1976.  It is located at 300 E. 21st Street in Cheyenne.  The house was listed on the National Register of Historic Places during 1969 as Governor's Mansion.

It is operated by the state as a historic house museum known as the Historic Governors' Mansion State Historic Site.   The mansion is open daily during summertime, and from Wednesday through Saturday during the remainder of the year.  Rooms have been decorated to represent the 1905, 1937, 1955 and 1960s eras. The Historic Mansion is also a contributing building in the Rainsford Historic District.

References

External links 
 Tour information and photos of the Wyoming Governor's Mansion

 Historic Governor's Mansion - visiting information
 Wyoming Governor's Mansion and Grounds at the Wyoming State Historic Preservation Office

Houses on the National Register of Historic Places in Wyoming
Governors' mansions in the United States
Houses in Cheyenne, Wyoming
Historic house museums in Wyoming
Architecture in Wyoming
Museums in Cheyenne, Wyoming
Government buildings in Wyoming
Houses completed in 1976
Colonial Revival architecture in Wyoming
Georgian architecture in Wyoming
Houses completed in 1904
National Register of Historic Places in Cheyenne, Wyoming
Individually listed contributing properties to historic districts on the National Register in Wyoming